Coleophora lusitanica is a moth of the family Coleophoridae. It is found in Portugal.

References

lusitanica
Moths of Europe